There were at least three class D California State Leagues in operation at some point in minor league baseball history. Two lasted just a single season (1910 and 1929) and the other lasted three seasons 1913 through 1915.

The 1910 version was actually class B until June 6, when it became class D. Sacramento and San Francisco dropped out May 31, and Oakland moved to Merced on June 7, which might explain the drop in classification. Then Fresno disbanded June 24, causing the league to cease operations the same day.

The league made it through the 1913 season then disbanded June 1, 1914. When it was re-tried in 1915, the league disbanded May 30, due to heavy rains, with the teams having played only 5 to 7 games.

The 1929 version, which was based in Southern California unlike the previous two versions, lasted until June 17, with teams having played about 50 games.

Cities Represented

1910
Fresno, CA: Fresno Tigers
Oakland, CA: Oakland Invaders
Merced, CA: Merced Fig Growers
Sacramento, CA: Sacramento Baby Senators
San Francisco, CA: San Francisco Baby Seals
San Jose, CA: San Jose Prune Pickers
Stockton, CA: Stockton Millers

Teams and Statistics

1910

1910 California State League
President: Frank Herman
#San Francisco and Sacramento disbanded May 31.##Oakland (24–19) moved to Merced June 7.###Fresno disbanded June 24 and the league ceased operations the same day.The league was a class B until June 6, when it became a class D league.

Cities Represented

1913–1915
Alameda, CA: Alameda 1915
Berkeley, CA: Berkeley 1915
Fresno, CA: Fresno Packers 1913; Fresno Tigers 1914
Modesto, CA: Modesto Reds 1914–1915
Oakland, CA: Oakland Commuters 1915
San Francisco, CA: San Francisco 1915
San Jose, CA: San Jose Bears 1913–1915
Stockton, CA: Stockton Producers 1913; Stockton Millers 1914–1915
Vallejo, CA: Vallejo Marines 1913
Watsonville, CA: Watsonville Pippins 1913

Teams and Statistics

1913–1915

1913 California State League
President: Allan T. Baum
#Vallejo (24–33) moved to Watsonville July 6.

1914 California State League
President: Allan T. Baum
The league disbanded June 1.

1915 California State League
President: Louis W. Schroeder, Jr.
Berkeley (0–2) moved to San Francisco April 28.The league disbanded May 30 due to heavy rains.No player statistics available.

Cities Represented

1929
Bakersfield, CA: Bakersfield Bees
Santa Ana, CA: Santa Ana Orange Countians
Pomona, CA: Pomona Arabs
Coronado, CA: Coronado Arabs
San Bernardino, CA: San Bernardino Padres
San Diego, CA: San Diego Aces

Teams and Statistics

1929

1929 California State League
President: Orville McPherson
#Santa Ana (4–20) moved to Pomona May 8, which played six games at San Bernardino.Pomona (2–4) moved to Coronado County May 15, playing their games at the San Diego ball park.The league disbanded June 17.

Sources
The Encyclopedia of Minor League Baseball: Second Edition.

Baseball leagues in California
Defunct baseball leagues in the United States
1910 establishments in California
1929 disestablishments in California
Defunct minor baseball leagues in the United States
Sports leagues established in 1910
Sports leagues disestablished in 1929